Rishi Kapoor (born Rishi Raj Kapoor; 4 September 1952  30 April 2020) was an Indian actor, film director and film producer who worked in Bollywood movies.

Filmography

Director

Notes

References

Bibliography

External links 
 
 
 

Male actor filmographies
Indian filmographies